The Suzuki Recursion is a turbocharged concept motorcycle shown by Suzuki at the 2013 Tokyo Auto Show. The engine is a 588 cc parallel-twin with intercooled turbo and traction control system. Kevin Cameron described its power delivery in Cycle World as "the torque of a liter-bike, given across a three-times-wider band and packaged into a light middleweight", and Gizmag's Mike Hanlon compared it to a Buell V-twin. 

Visordown.com said the intercooler was positioned under the saddle. It is unclear if this would be carried forward in a production motorcycle; other production models with under-tail exhausts and radiators (Benelli Tornado) have been criticized for un-ergonomic heat management.

See also
Suzuki#Concept motorcycles
Forced induction in motorcycles

Notes

References

Concept motorcycles
Motorcycles introduced in 2013
Recursion
Motorcycles powered by straight-twin engines